Markt Taschendorf is a municipality in the district of Neustadt (Aisch)-Bad Windsheim in Bavaria in Germany.

Mayor

Otmar Lorey is the mayor since May 2020.

References

 

Neustadt (Aisch)-Bad Windsheim